Hibbert Rock is a drying rock lying SE of League Rock located in the Quest Channel off the Southern tip of Adelaide Island.
Named by the UK Antarctic Place-Names Committee for William Hibbert, ship's Engineer of the RRS John Biscoe (1956) from the late 1950s to 1960s, the ship which assisted the Royal Navy Hydrographic survey Unit in surveying the area between 1962–1963.

References 

Antarctic Place-names Committee

Notes 

Rock formations of Adelaide Island